Memories: The '68 Comeback Special was a 1998 double album released by RCA Records that was a repackaging of material from the 1968 Elvis Presley television special, Elvis (commonly referred to as the Elvis Presley '68 Comeback Special).

Twenty-two of the compilation's 35 tracks were previously unreleased recordings, including several alternate takes. The album is named after the song "Memories" which appears twice on the album. The album includes exclusive songs that were never issued again, including full length, unedited versions of the gospel and road medleys, along with the opening "Trouble/Guitar Man" song without any overdubbed audience.

Track listing

References

1998 compilation albums
Compilation albums published posthumously
Elvis Presley compilation albums
RCA Records compilation albums